Anthony Ray (November 24, 1937 – June 29, 2018) was an American actor, assistant director, producer and production manager. He was nominated for an Academy Award in the category Best Picture for the film An Unmarried Woman. Ray died in June 2018 of an illness in Saco, Maine, at the age of 80. His wife Gloria Grahame had previously been married to his father.

Selected filmography 
 An Unmarried Woman (1978; co-nominated with Paul Mazursky)

References

External links 

1937 births
2018 deaths
People from Washington, D.C.
American film producers
American male film actors
American male television actors
20th-century American male actors
Unit production managers